Actias dubernardi, the Chinese moon moth, is a moth of the family Saturniidae. The species was first described by Charles Oberthür in 1897.

Range
This moth can be found in parts of China.

Life cycle
It takes 70–85 days to progress from an egg to the adult, depending on the temperature and humidity. The female releases pheromones that attracts the male so they can mate

Egg
The female lays up to 120 eggs, and may place their eggs anywhere. The egg is oval-shaped, 1.5 × 1 mm; whitish gray, and firmly stuck to branches or sides of the cage that the female had been kept in. Caterpillars, 4–5 mm long, hatch after 10–14 days, the warmer and the higher the humidity, the quicker it happens.

Larva

The newly hatched larva is black with hairs. It sheds its skin four times in its larval stage. In the first instar, it is initially black but becomes a deep red-brown as it grows.  In the second instar, it continues to lighten to an orange-brown.  In the third instar, it changes into a beautiful green with white stripes and silver/gold metallic reflective markings on the sides of the tubercles. Above the thoracic segments there is a stripe of white, black and red which can be opened and closed to show or hide the aposematic colouration.  It is hairy in all its stages, and it feeds on pine trees. The fully grown caterpillar is 60–75 mm long. It spins its brownish silk cocoon on the ground among moss or among pine needles. They are easy to rear, as long as they eat in their first instar. The species comes from high mountainous regions, so it is quite cold hardy. It is best reared indoors, sleeved on a small pine tree. Pinus Sylvestris, P. strobus, and P. nigra are confirmed efficient food plants. (Others have raised them on more, including Larix sp. and Pseudotsuga sp.) but they did not give the best results.

Pupa
The chrysalis is about 35 mm long, and the imago emerges from the cocoon after anywhere from about four to six weeks, depending on the temperature and humidity.

Adult
An adult moth's life is short, no longer than 10 to 12 days (females live longer due to the fact that the female sits still waiting for a mate). Pairing is easy in a medium-sized cage. With one female and one to two males per cage. A beautiful hybrid with Graellsia isabellae was obtained by a team of French entomologists (D. Adés, R. Cocault, R. Lemaitre, R. Zaun and R. Vuattoux).

Host plants
Pine tree - Pinus species. In the wild they eat Pinus massoniana. Caterpillars rather like Pinus sylvestris (Scots pine), but they will also eat Pinus nigra (black pine). Others have been used in captivity.

References

Dubernardi
Moths described in 1897
Moths of Asia